The Protura, or proturans, and sometimes nicknamed coneheads, are very small (0.6–1.5mm long), soil-dwelling animals, so inconspicuous they were not noticed until the 20th century. The Protura constitute an order of hexapods that were previously regarded as insects, and sometimes treated as a class in their own right.

Some evidence indicates the Protura are basal to all other hexapods, although not all researchers consider them Hexapoda, rendering the monophyly of Hexapoda unsettled. Uniquely among hexapods, proturans show anamorphic development, whereby body segments are added during moults.

There are close to 800 species, described in seven families. Nearly 300 species are contained in a single genus, Eosentomon.

Morphology 
Proturans have no eyes, wings, or antennae, and, lacking pigmentation, are usually white or pale brown. The sensory function of the antennae is fulfilled by the first of three pairs of five-segmented legs, which are held up, pointing forward and have many tarsal sensilla and sensory hairs. They walk with only four legs. The head is conical, and bears two pseudoculi with unknown function. The body is elongated and cylindrical, with a postanal telson at the end. The mouthparts are entognathous (enclosed within the head capsule) and consist of thin mandibles and maxillae. There are no cerci at the end of the abdomen, which gives the group their name, from the Greek proto- (meaning "first", in this case implying primitive), and ura, meaning "tail". The first three abdominal segments bear short limb-like appendages called "styli". First pair of styli is two-segmented, while the second and third pair are two-segmented or unsegmented. The genitalia are internal and the genital opening lies between the eleventh segment and the telson of the adult. The genitalia are everted from a chamber in both sexes. Only the two families Eosentomidae and Sinentomidae possess a simple tracheal system with a pair of spiracles on both mesothorax and metathorax (but never on the abdomen),  while those in the other families lack these structures and perform gas exchange by diffusion.

Ecology 

Proturans live chiefly in soil, mosses, and leaf litter of moist temperate forests that are not too acidic. They have also been found beneath rocks or under the bark of trees, as well as in animal burrows. Although they are sometimes considered uncommon, they are probably often overlooked because of their small size: densities of over 90,000 individuals per square metre have been measured.

The diet of proturans is not yet sufficiently observed, but they feed on mycorrhizal fungi, dead Acari, and mushroom powder in culture, and are thought to feed on decaying vegetable matter and fungi in the wild. The styliform mouthparts suggest the Protura are fluid feeders, with evidence that some species suck out the contents of fungal hyphae.

Proturans which live near the soil surface generally have one generation per year and have longer legs, while those that live deeper have shorter legs and reproduce less seasonally, although some migratory species move to deeper layers for the winter and shallower layers for the summer.

Development 
The nymph has 8 abdominal segments plus telson, but the number increases through moulting until the full adult number of 11 is reached. Further moults may occur, but do not add any more body segments, and it is not known whether the adults continue to moult through their lives. Eggs have only been observed in a few species. Five developmental stages follow: the prenymph hatches from the egg and has only weakly developed mouthparts and 8 abdominal segments; nymph I follows and has fully developed mouthparts; nymph II has 9 abdominal segments; maturus junior has 11 abdominal segments and is followed by the adult. The family Acerentomidae differs in having an extra preimago stage, with partially developed genitalia, between the maturus junior and the adult.

History 
Proturans were first discovered in the early 20th century, when Filippo Silvestri and Antonio Berlese discovered the animals independently. The first species to be described was Acerentomon doderoi, published in 1907 by Silvestri, based on material from near Syracuse, New York.

Impact on humans 
Proturans aid in decomposition by helping in the breakdown of leaf litter and recycling organic nutrients back into the soil. They thus play a role in soil formation and composition, which can be vital in soil restoration.

References

External links 

 
 
 Proturans on the University of Florida / Institute of Food and Agricultural Sciences Featured Creatures website

 
Arthropod orders
Taxa described in 1907
Taxa named by Filippo Silvestri